Antodice is a genus of beetles in the family Cerambycidae, containing the following species:

 Antodice abstrusa Lane, 1940
 Antodice aureicollis Martins & Galileo, 1985
 Antodice chemsaki McCarty, 2006
 Antodice cretata Bates, 1872
 Antodice eccentrica Galileo & Martins, 1992
 Antodice exilis Chemsak & Noguera, 1993
 Antodice fasciata Linsley, 1935
 Antodice inscripta Lane, 1970
 Antodice juncea Bates, 1881
 Antodice kyra Martins & Galileo, 1998
 Antodice lenticula Martins & Galileo, 1985
 Antodice lezamai McCarty, 2006
 Antodice mendesi Lane, 1940
 Antodice micromacula Galileo & Monne, 2008
 Antodice neivai Lane, 1940
 Antodice nympha Bates, 1881
 Antodice opena Martins & Galileo, 2004
 Antodice picta (Klug, 1825)
 Antodice pinima Martins & Galileo, 1998
 Antodice pudica Lane, 1970
 Antodice quadrimaculata Martins & Galileo, 2003
 Antodice quinquemaculata Lane, 1970
 Antodice sexnotata Franz, 1959
 Antodice spilota Martins & Galileo, 1998
 Antodice suturalis Galileo & Martins, 1992
 Antodice tricolor Martins & Galileo, 1985
 Antodice venustula Lane, 1973

References

 
Aerenicini